Jaylyn Robotham (born 21 October 2002) is a racing driver from Australia currently competing in the 2021 Super 2 Series with Image Racing Aligned with Erebus Motorsport.

Career

Karting 
Robotham started racing karts at the age of 11 and at the age of 14 he moved up into the Hyundai Excel Racing Series.

Hyundai Excel Series 
Robotham competed in his first race in a closed cockpit a week after his 14th birthday at Phillip island to become the youngest driver to compete in the series. In 2017 he won the South Australian State Championship. Placed 2nd at the Excel Nationals, 3rd in the Victorian CAMS State Championship and held multiple lap records in 2018 he placed 2nd in the Victorian State Championship.

Toyota 86 Racing Series 
In 2018, Robotham Debuted in the Toyota 86 Racing Series placing second in his first race in the championship. He then went on and placed 5th in his debut season after not competing at Bathurst due to him being too young. In 2019 Robotham returned and finished 6th in the championship

TA2 Asia 
Robotham Partnered With Paul Manuell From NZ and they achieved 5 wins out of 10 races. In that year they won the Bang Saen Beach Grand Prix.

Career results 

Season still in progress*

Complete Bathurst 1000 results

References

External links 
 Profile at Driver Database
 Profile on Toyota NZ
 Young guns Link
 Livery Reveal Super 3 
 official website

2002 births
Living people
Australian racing drivers
Supercars Championship drivers